The Missouri Meerschaum Company is a tobacco smoking pipe manufacturer located in Washington, Missouri.  It is the world's oldest and largest manufacturer of corncob pipes.

The company was founded in 1869 when Dutch-American woodworker Henry Tibbe began producing corncob pipes and selling them in his shop. Tibbes likened the pipes to meerschaum pipes and thus named them "Missouri Meerschaum." In 1878 Tibbe patented his method of fireproofing the pipes by applying a plaster-like substance to the outside of the cob. In 1883 Tibbe and his son Anton applied for a U.S. Patent to trademark their Missouri Meerschaum pipe. In 1907 H. Tibbe & Son Co. became the Missouri Meerschaum Company.

The Missouri Meerschaum Company's factory currently produces 3,500 pipes per day and ships these pipes to every U.S. state and several foreign countries.

External links
Official Website
Tibbe-Cuthbertson Family, Papers, 1849-1975 (C3711), State Historical Society of Missouri
Blog With History, Photos & Information About Missouri Meerschaum Corn Cob Pipes

Pipe makers
Companies based in Missouri
Franklin County, Missouri